Hits and Pieces is a DVD released by the Australian band The Screaming Jets in 2004. It features video clips, interviews, documentary footage and live recordings recorded up until the release of Hits and Pieces (CD) in 1999.

Track listing
 "Introduction...The Screaming Jets" - 1:54
 "C'Mon" - 2:49
 "Early Days And F.R.C." - 1:58
 "Better" - 4:51
 "Shower Scene" - 1:18
 "Stop The World" - 4:50
 "Young Blood" - 1:41
 "Shine On" - 5:22
 "UK Press Conference" - 0:19
 "Think" - 6:00
 "Harbour Mayhem" - 4:50
 "Here I Go" - 4:46
 "Palais Royale Newcastle" - 0:33
 "Helping Hand" - 4:47
 "Making Of Shivers" - 0:29
 "Shivers" - 4:28
 "Surfest Jam" - 2:35
 "Tunnel" - 3:51
 "Toronto Canada" - 3:02
 "Living In England" - 2:18
 "Reefer Madness" (Live) - 3:24
 "Sad Song" - 3:03
 "Knight's Day" - 3:45
 "Friend Of Mine" - 3:36
 "Making Of Wold Gone Crazy Part 1" - 1:30
 "Elvis (I Remember...)" - 3:51
 "Making Of Wold Gone Crazy Part 2" - 4:51
 "Eve Of Destruction" - 3:26
 "Making Of Wold Gone Crazy Part 3" - 4:13
 "October Grey" - 3:57
 "The Madness Of Touring" - 6:30
 "Individuality" - 3:59
 "Randwick Racecourse (Live)" - 3:28
 "Shine Over Me" - 3:43
 "Bondi Patrol" (Channel [V] Live) - 2:43
 "Higher With You" - 2:49
 "F#!k Off" - 3:56

Charts

References

The Screaming Jets albums
2004 video albums
2004 compilation albums
Music video compilation albums